Marina Roy is a visual artist, educator and writer based in Vancouver, British Columbia.

Life
Roy was born in Quebec City, and moved to Vancouver, British Columbia in her youth. She obtained a B.A. in French Literature at Université Laval, a B.F.A. from the Nova Scotia College of Art and Design, and an M.F.A. from the University of British Columbia.  She has shown nationally and internationally, including the Vancouver Art Gallery, the Contemporary Art Gallery, Centre A, Malaspina, and Or Gallery. She is an Associate Professor at the University of British Columbia, Department of Art History, Visual Art and Theory.

Artistic practice 
Roy's practice is cross disciplinary, with a focus on drawing, painting and animation.  Her work investigates material intelligence in a post-humanist perspective. The evolution of her practice draws upon Freud and Bataille, demonstrating modes of fantasy, eroticism, and compulsion by way of changed symbols and recognized icons. The Canadian artist's use of cartoons also aligns her with the domain of the death drive: According to Žižek, characters like Wile E. Coyote occupy a libidinal space where one can live through any catastrophe.

Collaborations
Roy has collaborated with artist Natasha McHardy as the group "Roy & McHardy", in video performance productions of a DIY ethos. Roy has also collaborated on a web-site project with David Clark and Graham Meiser, creating an online extension of her book Sign After the X. She has also collaborated with artist Abbas Akhavan in artworks, such as the video installation Victoria Day (Bombay Sapphire), wherein they update Manet, with a performance titled "liquid luncheon on the grass", as well as duo exhibitions such as Neighbours and Fire/Fire.

Select exhibitions
2018: Leaning Out of Windows, Michael O’Brian Exhibition Commons, Emily Carr University, Vancouver
2017: Landfall and Departure: Prologue, Nanaimo Art Gallery
2017: Becoming Animal/Becoming Landscape, Kamloops Art Gallery
2016: Becoming Animal/Becoming Landscape, Morris and Helen Belkin Art Gallery, University of British Columbia 
2016: Your Kingdom to Command, Vancouver Art Gallery (Offsite)
2015: The Floating Archipelago, Connexion ARC, Fredericton, NB
2015: Screen Play: Print and the Moving Image, Open Studio, Toronto
2013: Once things are reduced to nothing, Artspeak
 2012: Fire Fire (in collaboration with Abbas Akhavan), Malaspina Printmakers & Centre A
 2011: What's Pushed out the door, Comes back through the window, (part 2) La Central
 2011: New Work, Contemporary Art Gallery
 2011: Unreal, Vancouver Art Gallery
 2009: How soon is now, Vancouver Art Gallery
 2008: When the Mood Strikes Us, Platform Gallery 
2008: Neighbours (in collaboration with Abbas Akhavan; curated by Joni Murphy and Kika Thorne), AMS Gallery
 2006-08: Trappings (participant in the public art library project Group Search (Art in the Library), Vancouver Public Library)
 2006: Beauty and the Beast, Alternator Gallery
 2006: Everyday Every Other Day, Art Gallery of Mississauga
 2004-06: Roy and McHardy (in collaboration with Natasha McHardy). Or Gallery, Concordia University VAV Gallery
 2002: Greener Pastures (in collaboration with Abbas Akhavan): Open Space Gallery, Artspeak

Bibliography
 Kathleen Ritter, How soon is now, exhibition catalogue, Vancouver Art Gallery
 Julie Tremble, Marina Roy/Abbas Akhavan: Menagerie, exhibition catalogue, AXENEO7/DAIMON
 Joni Murphy, Better Homes and Gardens, VIVO Media Arts Centre
 J.J. Kegan McFadden, When the Mood Strikes Us…, Platform Gallery
 Lorna Brown, "Marina Roy: Trappings", Vancouver Public Library
 Seamus Kealy, "The King and I," Morris and Helen Belkin Art Gallery
 Seamus Kealy, "A Few Notes on an Everyday Exhibition,"  Blackwood Gallery
 Sydney Hermant, "Roy and McHardy," in d'Or (Goin' Solo), Vancouver: Or Gallery
 Jeremy Todd, "Some errant thoughts" in d'Or: Explorations in Psychic Geography, Vancouver: Or Gallery

Reviews
 Claer, José "Menage a trois: entre l'humain, l'animal et l'art," 
 Dahle, Sigrid "When the Mood Strikes Us…"
 Milroy, Sarah "Pictures are out—experience is in"
 Witt, Andrew "Contemporary Public Art at Vancouver Library" 
 Tomic, Milena "Everyday Every Other Day"

Writing
Marina Roy's art practice and writing inform and intersect in their investigation of material, language, history and ideology.  She published Sign after the x (Artspeak/Arsenal Pulp Press) in 2001.  She contributes reviews and critical essays, for artists such as Lyse Lemieux and Abbas Akhavan, in various magazines and catalogues.

Publications
Roy's first book, Sign After the x (with Artspeak Gallery) was published in 2002.
In Haguenau Forest (short story), in there's something I want to show you
Holy Shit  C Magazine, December 2010

Honours
VIVA Award, 2010

References

External links
WAAP ART
leftcoastart.ca

Academic staff of the University of British Columbia
NSCAD University alumni
University of British Columbia alumni
Artists from Quebec
Artists from Vancouver
Canadian animators
Canadian women animators
Canadian women painters
Living people
21st-century Canadian painters
Year of birth missing (living people)